Emilijana Rizoska (born 21 May 2005) is a Macedonian female handballer for WHC Gjorche Petrov and the North Macedonia national team.

She represented the North Macedonia at the 2022 European Women's Handball Championship.

References

External links

2005 births
Living people
People from Bitola